U-mutation, or u-umlaut, can refer to various processes that occurred in the history of some Germanic languages:

 Old Norse u-umlaut, allophones of non-rounded vowels before back rounded vowels being made distinctive around the 8th century
Icelandic u-umlaut, a similar process affecting only  and operating productively in modern Icelandic
 Old English back mutation, a change that took place in late prehistoric Old English